The Pittsburgh Panthers football statistical leaders are individual statistical leaders of the Pittsburgh Panthers football program in various categories, including passing, rushing, receiving, total offense, defensive stats, kicking, and scoring. Within those areas, the lists identify single-game, single-season, and career leaders. The Panthers represent University of Pittsburgh in the NCAA's Atlantic Coast Conference.

Although Pittsburgh began competing in intercollegiate football in 1890, the school's official record book considers the "modern era" to have begun in the 1950s. Records from before this year are often incomplete and inconsistent, and they are generally not included in these lists.

These lists are dominated by more recent players for several reasons:
 Since the 1950s, seasons have increased from 10 games to 11 and then 12 games in length.
 The NCAA didn't allow freshmen to play varsity football until 1972 (with the exception of the World War II years), allowing players to have four-year careers.
 The NCAA only began counting bowl games toward single-season and career statistics in 2002, and most programs follow this practice. Pitt does not; its official record books include all postseason performances. The Panthers have played in 14 bowl games since the NCAA's policy change and will play a 15th in 2022, giving many recent players an extra game to accumulate NCAA-recognized statistics.
 Pitt played in the ACC Championship Game in 2018 and 2021, giving players in those seasons yet another game in which to accumulate statistics.
 Due to COVID-19, the NCAA ruled that the 2020 season would not count against the athletic eligibility of any football player, giving all players who appeared in that season five years of eligibility instead of the normal four.

These lists are updated through the 2022 regular season. Note that Pittsburgh's official media guide does not give a full top 10 in many of these categories.

Passing

Passing yards

Passing touchdowns

Rushing

Rushing yards

Rushing touchdowns

Receiving

Receptions

Receiving yards

Receiving touchdowns

Total offense
Total offense is the sum of passing and rushing statistics. It does not include receiving or returns.

Total offense yards

Touchdowns responsible for
"Touchdowns responsible for" is the NCAA's official term for combined passing and rushing touchdowns.

Defense

Interceptions

Tackles

Sacks

Kicking

Field goals made (since 2000)

Field goal percentage

Scoring

Points

Touchdowns 
In official NCAA statistics, touchdown totals include touchdowns scored. Accordingly, these lists include rushing, receiving, and return touchdowns, but not passing touchdowns

References

Pittsburgh